The third season of the Canadian science fiction–fantasy television series Sanctuary, premiered on Syfy in the United States on October 15, 2010 and consists of 20 episodes. Created by Damian Kindler, the series was adapted from a series of webisodes released in 2007. The increased number of episodes in this season allows the producers to include numerous story arcs. The second half of the third season premiered on April 15, 2011 until it was moved to Monday nights on April 25, 2011.

Premise
The Sanctuary team deal with the aftermath of the gigantic tidal wave released by Big Bertha while Will's life remains in balance but soon the errand comes to an end once Will leads one final plea to "Kali" A.K.A. Big Bertha in his near death experience to stop the destruction. Following Will's return to life two abnormals appear to him to rekindle his memory and in doing so Will remembers an important message that Gregory sent for Helen to find an underground city with great technology and secrets.

Later Nikola sends an SOS call and after his rescue continues to help Helen in discovering the secrets of the city which eventually leads them to a Hollow Earth atlas. Soon Adam Worth, a former acquaintance, tricks Helen and causes radiation poisoning (that should kill both Helen and Adam in a few weeks) so that she may show Adam the Hollow Earth. Upon Adam's interference Helen, Will, Henry and Kate enter the city to save Gregory and find a cure for the poisoning but only to be executed immediately when caught while Adam imprisons John, leaving Tesla and Big-Guy alone in the mysteries. Magnus is then revived by Ranna for answering and Magnus finds out that she needs her to help an abnormal from the events of 'KALI', thereby Magnus and the gang is revived and she given the cure and is reunited with her father, together Gregory and Helen save the abnormal and reach the surface back again while John kills Adam.

The show returned to its original format, featuring a new short story for every episode until Tesla and Magnus discover a Praxian Stronghold. This is revealed to have been taken by Vampires and as such was a Vampire Stronghold where a whole army of Vampires and their queen were buried to be awakened someday. Magnus views this as a threat and destroys the stronghold, but not before restoring Tesla to a Vampire again.

Cast

Main
 Amanda Tapping as Helen Magnus
 Robin Dunne as Will Zimmerman
 Ryan Robbins as Henry Foss
 Agam Darshi as Kate Freelander
 Christopher Heyerdahl as Bigfoot / John Druitt

Recurring
 Jonathon Young as Nikola Tesla
 Ian Tracey as Adam Worth
 Robert Lawrenson as Declan McRae
 Paul McGillion as Terrence Wexford
 Pascale Hutton as Abby Corrigan

Guest
 Callum Blue as Edward Forsythe
 Sahar Biniaz as Kali
 Peter Wingfield as James Watson
 Peter DeLuise as Ernie Watts
 Polly Walker as Ranna
 Edge (credited as WWE Superstar Edge) as Thelo

Episodes

Production

On December 12, 2009 Sanctuary was renewed for a third season consisting of 20 episodes. It will conclude the second-season cliffhanger. The expanded season will also give the producers the opportunity to involve "really big story arcs", as well as exploring more on Helen's past and deal with "something that's much bigger than Big Bertha." Former Rome and Caprica actress Polly Walker will guest star as antagonist Ranna in two episodes during the middle of the season. In addition, former wrestler Edge (Adam Copeland) will guest star as an abnormal named Thelo in the season finale, scheduled to air during the Spring 2011. Production of the season commenced on March 15, 2010.

Broadcast and reception

Broadcast and ratings
Syfy originally announced that the third season will premiere alongside the second season of Stargate Universe on September 28, 2010. However, they later announced it will be delayed until Friday, October 15 on their original 10 pm timeslot. The season premiere "Kali, Part 3" was seen by almost 1.8 million viewers and 1.3 household ratings. Viewership increased 17 per cent in total viewers, and 12 per cent among adults aged 18 through 49, compared to the average for season two. After the fall season concluded, the first ten episode averaged 1.483 million viewers, with an adults 18–49 rating of 0.4, per episode, making it one of the higher rated shows in 2010 for the network.

The spring season began airing on April 15, 2011 with 1.217 million viewers, a season low. Syfy later announced it would swap the show with Urban Legends where it was moved to Monday nights and be paired with Stargate Universe starting April 25 due to the low rating from the mid season premiere. However ratings for the show worsened, with 868,000 viewers watching "One Night". Ratings hit an all-time low when only 656,000 saw "Normandy". However, the last three episodes of the season saw a sizeable recovery, likely due to the ending of the 2010/11 broadcast season from the major networks; nearly 1.3 million watched the season finale. The spring season averaged 997,000 however, though Syfy picked up the show for a fourth season in January 2011. In Canada the season premiered on the Space channel on October 15, 2010. In the United Kingdom, the satellite channel Watch bought the rights to show the third season of the show. The previous two season were shown on ITV4.

Awards and nominations

The third season won three Leo Awards out of seventeen nominations. Jean Tejkel, Kevin Sands, Hugo de la Cerda, Kevin Belen won "Best Overall Sound in a Dramatic Series" for "Kali, Part 3". Christina McQuarrie won "Best Costume Design in a Dramatic Series" for her role in "For King and Country". Ryan Robbins won "Best Supporting Performance by a Male" for his role in "Animus". it was the second time he won the award in the category, the first time being in 2009. The season was also nominated for "Best Dramatic Series", but lost out to the final season of Smallville.

Home video releases
The third season was released on DVD and Blu-ray by E1 Entertainment in the United States on September 13, 2011 and in the United Kingdom on September 26, 2011. The six-disc set consists of all 20 episodes, with audio commentaries from cast and crew on selected episodes. The set also includes numerous special featurettes: Visual Effects of Sanctuary Season 3, Amanda Tapping Directs "One Night", Hollow Earth, Damian Kindler: In the Director's Chair, The Music of Sanctuary, Behind the Scenes: Normandy, and Character Profile: Nikola Tesla, as well as a blooper reel.

References

External links
 

2010 Canadian television seasons
2011 in Canadian television
Sanctuary (TV series)
2011 Canadian television seasons